Zhao Yi (born 22 January 1979) is a Chinese former swimmer who competed in the 1996 Summer Olympics.

References

1979 births
Living people
Chinese male backstroke swimmers
Olympic swimmers of China
Swimmers at the 1996 Summer Olympics
Place of birth missing (living people)
20th-century Chinese people